Faiava is a tribal settlement on the island of Olosega on Ofu-Olosega

References 

Populated places in American Samoa